The government of San Jose, officially the City of San José, operates as a charter city within California law under the San José City Charter. The elected government of the city, which operates as a council–manager government, is composed of the Mayor of San Jose (currently Matt Mahan), the San Jose City Council, and several other elected offices. 

The greater public administration of San Jose includes numerous entities, including the San Jose Police Department, the San Jose Fire Department, and the San Jose Public Library, as well as a mix of state and county level institutions.

Organization
San Jose utilizes a council–manager government, composed of the mayor, city council, several elected officers, and numerous other entities.

Mayor

Current mayor 

The current Mayor of San Jose is Matt Mahan, beginning his first term as a Councilmember in 2020 and as Mayor in 2022.

Former mayors

City Council

The legislative body is composed of the 11-member San Jose City Council, which is made up of 10 councilmembers, each representing and elected by a district, and the Mayor of San Jose elected citywide. The City Council is empowered by the City Charter to formulate citywide policy, adopt laws or ordinances, and approve city budgets.

Council appointees

The City Council appoints five officials to manage the City organization and support the City Council for effective governance:
City Manager
City Auditor
City Clerk
City Attorney
Independent Police Auditor

References

External links

 Official Site of the City of San Jose